Phoebe Patricia Faircloth (born 4 November 1988), known professionally  as Phoebe Dahl, is a British-American fashion designer.

Career
Dahl began her career in Amsterdam working as an assistant to Dutch fashion designer Jackie Villevoye before returning to Los Angeles in 2013. Dahl founded Faircloth & Supply in late 2012 after a trip to Japan and India, but it was not until she returned to Los Angeles in 2013 that she launched it. In 2014, she collaborated with the Australian model and television presenter Ruby Rose to design street-wear for Dahl's ethical clothing range Faircloth & Supply. In 2015, Dahl created T-shirt designs for Verve Coffee Roasters. She was awarded "Racked’s 30 Under 30 Rising Designers".

In 2016, Dahl was named the Creative Director at the incubator for emerging brands , and launched the company Cardinahl + Dahl as a collaboration with Ruby Cardinahl.

Dahl started her fashion brand working with the nonprofit organization General Welfare Pratisthan. For each item sold, the organization donates two school uniforms, school supplies, and a one-year scholarship to a girl in Nepal. Issues of concern to her include the LGBT community, women empowerment, women's health care.

Personal life
She is the daughter of British screenwriter Lucy Dahl, and granddaughter of British author Roald Dahl and American actress Patricia Neal.

Dahl is a lesbian. In 2014, Dahl became engaged to Australian actress Ruby Rose; they ended their relationship in December 2015. In February 2017, Dahl began dating DJ and former model Tatiana de Leon.

References

External links

1988 births
Living people
American fashion designers
American women fashion designers
LGBT fashion designers
Phoebe
American people of Welsh descent
American people of Norwegian descent